Oksefjorden is a fjord in Lebesby Municipality in Troms og Finnmark county, Norway. It is located just southwest of Cape Nordkinn on the Nordkinn Peninsula. The uninhabited fishing village of Oksevåg is located at the innermost part of the fjord.

See also
 List of Norwegian fjords

References

Fjords of Troms og Finnmark
Lebesby